Angel's Fall is a 2005 Turkish-Greek drama film directed by Semih Kaplanoğlu.

Cast
Tülin Özen as Zeynep
Budak Akalin as Selçuk
Musa Karagöz as Müfit
Engin Dogan as Mustafa
Yeşim Ceren Bozoğlu as Funda
Can Kolukisa

References

External links

2005 drama films
Turkish drama films
Films directed by Semih Kaplanoğlu